The First Conspiracy is an album by The (International) Noise Conspiracy.  It is a compilation of four 7" records that were released in Europe earlier that year. It was first released on International Workers' Day in 1999 on the record label G7 Welcoming Committee. In 2002, it was re-released with new cover art on Burning Heart Records.  The record serves as a compilation of the first recordings by the band and acts as a framework for the ideas and musical themes that would become more fully formed on their debut album the following year, Survival Sickness.

Track listing

Although it shares a title, "Black Mask" is not the same composition as what was featured on Armed Love

References

1999 debut albums
First Conspiracy, The
Burning Heart Records albums
G7 Welcoming Committee Records albums